The 1993–94 MetJHL season is the 3rd season of the Metro Junior A Hockey League (MetJHL). The 14 teams of the Fullan and Bauer Divisions competed in a 50-game schedule.  The top 4 teams in each division made the playoffs.

The winner of the MetJHL playoffs, the Wexford Raiders, attended the Buckland Cup championship hosted by the team they beat in the league final, the Caledon Canadians.  Caledon won the Buckland Cup as hosts, but lost the 1994 Dudley Hewitt Cup in Timmins, Ontario.

Changes
MetJHL joins Ontario Hockey Association.
MetJHL joins Canadian Junior A Hockey League.
Weston Dukes move and become Thornhill Islanders.
Caledon Canadians join MetJHL from CJAHL.

Final standings
Note: GP = Games played; W = Wins; L = Losses; OTL = Overtime losses; SL = Shootout losses; GF = Goals for; GA = Goals against; PTS = Points; x = clinched playoff berth; y = clinched division title; z = clinched conference title

1993–94 MetJHL Playoffs

Quarter-final
Wexford Raiders defeated Kingston Voyageurs 4-games-to-1
Thornhill Islanders defeated Wellington Dukes 4-games-to-1
Caledon Canadians defeated Bramalea Blues 4-games-to-2
Muskoka Bears defeated St. Michael's Buzzers 4-games-to-2
Semi-final
Wexford Raiders defeated Thornhill Islanders 4-games-to-none
Caledon Canadians defeated Muskoka Bears 4-games-to-2
Final
Wexford Raiders defeated Caledon Canadians 4-games-to-none

1994 Buckland Cup Championships
The event was hosted by the Caledon Canadians in North York, Ontario.  The Caledon Canadians won the event, Wexford Raiders finished third in the round robin and did not advance.

Round Robin
Caledon Canadians defeated Wexford Raiders 4-2
Caledon Canadians defeated Powassan Hawks (NOJHL) 3-2 OT
Orillia Terriers (OPJHL) defeated Wexford Raiders 4-3 OT
Orillia Terriers (OPJHL) defeated Caledon Canadians 3-0
Wexford Raiders defeated Powassan Hawks (NOJHL) 4-3

Final
Caledon Canadians defeated Orillia Terriers (OPJHL) 3-1

1994 Dudley Hewitt Cup Championships
The event was hosted by the Timmins Golden Bears in Timmins, Ontario, Hearst, Ontario, and Kirkland Lake, Ontario.  The Caledon Canadians lost in the semi-final.

Round Robin
Chateauguay Elites (QPJHL) defeated Caledon Canadians 5-4
Gloucester Rangers (CJHL) defeated Caledon Canadians 6-1
Caledon Canadians defeated Timmins Golden Bears (NOJHL) 4-2
Caledon Canadians defeated Thunder Bay Flyers (USHL) 3-1

Semi-final
Thunder Bay Flyers (USHL) defeated Caledon Canadians 4-3

Players selected in 1994 NHL Entry Draft
Rd 6 #132	Bates Battaglia -	Mighty Ducks of Anaheim (Caledon Canadians)
Rd 10 #250	Kevin Harper -	St. Louis Blues	(Wexford Raiders)

See also
 1994 Centennial Cup
 Dudley Hewitt Cup
 List of Ontario Hockey Association Junior A seasons
 Ontario Junior A Hockey League
 Northern Ontario Junior Hockey League
 1993 in ice hockey
 1994 in ice hockey

References

External links
 Official website of the Ontario Junior Hockey League
 Official website of the Canadian Junior Hockey League

Metro Junior A Hockey League seasons
MetJHL